Lacanobia radix, the garden arches, is a species of cutworm or dart moth in the family Noctuidae. It is found in North America.

The MONA or Hodges number for Lacanobia radix is 10298.

References

Further reading

 
 
 

Lacanobia
Articles created by Qbugbot
Moths described in 1857